Adolphe Paul Barbarin (May 5, 1899 – February 17, 1969) was an American jazz drummer from New Orleans.

Career
Barbarin grew up in New Orleans in a family of musicians, including his father Isidore, three of his brothers (including Louis), and his nephew (Danny Barker). He was a member of the Silver Leaf Orchestra and the Young Olympia Band. He moved to Chicago in 1917 and worked with Freddie Keppard and Jimmie Noone. From 1925–1927, he was a member of King Oliver's band.

During the following year, he moved to New York City and played in Luis Russell's band for about four years. He left Russell and worked as a freelance musician, but he returned to Russell's band when it supported Louis Armstrong. For a brief time beginning in 1942, he worked for Red Allen's sextet, with Sidney Bechet in 1944 and Art Hodes in 1953. In 1955, he founded the Onward Brass Band in New Orleans. He spent the rest of his life as the leader of that band.

Barbarin died on February 17, 1969, while playing snare drums during a Mardi Gras parade. Record producer Al Rose said that his funeral "attracted one of the great mobs in New Orleans funeral history."

Personal life 
Barbarin was Catholic.

References

External links
 Paul Barbarin at Drummerworld
 Paul Barbarin at The Red Hot Jazz Archive
 Paul Barbarin recordings at the Discography of American Historical Recordings.

Dixieland jazz musicians
1899 births
1969 deaths
20th-century African-American musicians
Jazz musicians from New Orleans
American jazz drummers
20th-century American drummers
American male drummers
20th-century American male musicians
American male jazz musicians
Preservation Hall Jazz Band members
Young Tuxedo Brass Band members
African-American Catholics
Southland Records artists
Atlantic Records artists
London Records artists
Storyville Records artists
Riverside Records artists